Max Raskin (November 8, 1902August 22, 1984) was a Latvian American immigrant, lawyer, and judge.  Raskin served as Milwaukee City Attorney from 1932 to 1936 and later served as a Wisconsin Circuit Court Judge in Milwaukee County from 1963 to 1973.

Life and career 
Raskin was born to Jewish parents in the Russian Empire and emigrated with his family at the age of nine.  He graduated from the Marquette University Law School in 1926 and practiced in Milwaukee as a labor law attorney.  Raskin ran unsuccessfully for Milwaukee County District Attorney in 1930.  In 1932, he was elected Milwaukee City Attorney as a Socialist, unseating nonpartisan incumbent John M. Niven.  After his election, Raskin appointed former judge and Socialist politician William F. Quick as his first assistant and employed Edwin Knappe, a former Socialist state Representative, as an assistant city attorney.  As city attorney, Raskin collaborated closely with Mayor Daniel W. Hoan, also a Socialist, and required assistant city attorneys to relinquish any employment in private practice.  He was harshly criticized by the conservative Milwaukee Sentinel for "his refusal to prosecute communistic rioters".

Raskin was defeated in his 1936 reelection bid and reentered private practice.  In 1937, he was elected as a national committeeman of the Socialist Party of America but, in 1940, he left the party and joined the Wisconsin Progressive Party. In 1944, he became a Democrat.  Raskin ran for judicial office in 1949 and 1956 but was twice defeated; in 1963, his political ally Governor John W. Reynolds, Jr., appointed him to the Milwaukee County Circuit Court.  Raskin served on the court until 1973 and, following his mandatory retirement at the age of 70, continued to serve the state as a reserve judge.  In that capacity, he stepped in as Acting Circuit Court Judge in Waukesha County for Judge William E. Gramling during a lengthy struggle with cancer.  He died in 1984 at the age of 81.

Raskin's nephew, Marcus Raskin, was a progressive activist and social critic.

References

 

 

1904 births
1984 deaths
Emigrants from the Russian Empire to the United States
American people of Latvian-Jewish descent
Jewish socialists
Politicians from Milwaukee
Marquette University Law School alumni
Wisconsin city attorneys
Wisconsin state court judges
Jewish American attorneys
Wisconsin Democrats
Wisconsin Progressives (1924)
20th-century American politicians
Socialist Party of America politicians from Wisconsin
Lawyers from Milwaukee
20th-century American judges
20th-century American lawyers